Pellet grills, sometimes referred to as pellet smokers, are outdoor cookers that combine elements of charcoal smokers, gas grills, and kitchen ovens. Fueled by wood pellets, they can smoke as well as grill, braise, sear and bake using an PID electric control panel to automatically feed fuel pellets to the fire, regulate the grill’s airflow, and maintain consistent cooking temperatures.

History

Early history and development 
Pellet grills have their beginnings in pellet stoves. During the 1973 oil crisis, an increased demand for affordable home heating spearheaded a push toward alternative heat sources, which would later include wood pellets. Wood pellets were invented in the United States in the late 1970s, they are small eraser-sized capsules made of compressed sawdust. By the early 1980s Jerry Whitfield, a Boeing aviation engineer from Washington, and Joe Traeger, who ran a family-owned heating company in Oregon, were each experimenting with pellet-burning stoves. Although the stoves looked like traditional wood stoves, they worked much differently. Run by electricity, the pellet stoves utilized a motor-driven auger to deliver a specific amount of pellets from the storage hopper to a fire pot, where a fan aided combustion and blew the warm air from the stove.

Traeger grills

Joe Traeger developed the Traeger pellet grill in 1985 and patented it in 1986. Early Traeger Grills, as well as many of the pellet grills first introduced after the expiration of the Traeger patent, used a three-position controller, called an LMH controller indicating settings for low, medium and high heat. Each setting approximates a temperature range, and those temperatures were achieved by means of a fixed, predetermined duty cycle. Furthermore, because the duty cycles are fixed, they don't account for weather conditions or the amount of food being cooked, both of which affect temperature.

As a result of its patent, Traeger was the only manufacturer of pellet grills for twenty years. During that time, the company remained a small family-run business that distributed its pellet grills to a limited network of stores. After Traeger's patent expired in 2006, other pellet grill companies entered the market with similar technology. Joe Traeger's technology was reproduced by numerous companies, from the already well established grill company, to the small business owner trying to break into the market, prompting new innovations and technologies to new and future grills. When the patent expired in 2006, Joe Traeger and his son Brian sold their rights to Traeger Grills to a Florida Venture Capitalist for $12.4 million. In 2014 the Florida firm sold Traeger Grills to the private equity firm Trilantic Capital Partners. In 2018, Joe and Brian Traeger were hired by Danson's, which owned several grill companies including Louisiana Grills and Pit Boss Grills. In 2019, Louisiana Grills announced the hire by unveiling a new line of grills, the Founders Legacy line, and advertisements stated “brought to you proudly by Joe Traeger, the founder of the original pellet grill,” and showed the famous "Traeger Barn" that had been used in many of Traeger's advertisements. The new owners sued the Traeger's and Danson's for using the barn, and promotions involving the Traeger's, and won.

Function 

Although pellet stoves and pellet grills both run on wood pellets, there are differences in the pellets they burn. In addition to hardwood, pellets used for home heating often contain softwood and biomass scrap (such as bark), both of which can produce a bad taste and could be harmful if ingested. Pellet grills, on the other hand, use food-grade pellets that are made entirely from hardwood and contain no additives, although some manufacturers use soybean oil or vegetable oil as a lubricant during production.

Because of their small size and composition, food-grade pellets burn cleanly, producing a light smoky flavor. Wood pellet varieties include oak, maple, apple, alder, mesquite, cherry, hickory, and pecan.

This method of cooking, known as indirect (or convection) cooking is also used by traditional charcoal and wood smokers. That similarity, and the fact that wood pellets produce smoke that flavors food, resulted in many early adopters turning to pellet grills as an easy-to-use alternative to traditional smokers.

Some pellet grill manufacturers have implemented Wi-Fi-enabled controls that allow for remote monitoring of the grill. Pellet grill technology is being integrated into other cooking devices, such as traditional ceramic Kamado style grills, and pizza ovens.

Temperature control 

Pellet grill temperatures are largely determined by the amount of fuel consumed by the fire and airflow regulation. However, unlike grills, pellet grills use automated fuel and air delivery, and can maintain a user-selected temperature. Although this reduces user workload, the process that makes it possible is more complex than traditional grills.

First, the desired temperature is programmed into the electronic control panel. A motor-driven auger then feeds a small amount of pellets from the hopper to the fire pot. Once the fire is ready, the desired temperature is achieved via a repeated duty cycle, which represents a segment of time when the auger is active and idle. A single duty cycle starts when the auger turns on and begins feeding pellets then continues through the period when it shuts off and remains idle. The duty cycle ends when the auger turns on again. For example, a pellet grill set to  might have an auger-on period of 10 seconds followed by an auger-off period of 50 seconds. Duty cycles are typically stated as a percentage that represents the amount of time the auger is running—an auger that's always on has a 100% duty cycle, while one that is on half the time has a 50% duty cycle. Each temperature setting has a different duty cycle. However, regardless of that temperature setting, the auger-on portion of the duty cycle remains constant. The auger-off period is the variable. Lower temperatures have longer auger-off periods, while high temperatures have shorter.

Multi-position and digital controllers

Rather than use multi-position controllers, some brands have switched to fully digital control panels that, in addition to a LED display, use a one-touch interface similar to a kitchen oven. Digital controllers utilize simple microprocessors that work in conjunction with the sensors to create a feedback loop, allowing the pellet grill to make small adjustments to auger activity. The sensor measures the grill temperature and sends the information to the controller, which initiates or halts the auger when the grill exceeds or falls below a specified threshold.

In addition to providing more temperature options, multi-position and digital controllers developed more refined auger duty cycles. The shorter auger-on period allows the pellet grill to achieve and maintain a wider range of temperatures. It also keeps large amounts of pellets from pilling up in the fire pot, helping to prevent sudden, sharp temperature swings.

PID controllers (adjustable duty cycle)
Similar to other controllers, when the desired temperature is set into a PID controller, the pellet grill ignites the pellets and begins an initial warm-up to a predetermined temperature. Once that has been reached, the pellet grill begins climbing toward the programmed temperature. As it does, the PID controller undergoes a process of trial and error, fine tuning the rate at which pellets are fed by learning how long and how much fuel it takes to raise the pellet grill's temperature under the current conditions. Using an advanced algorithm, the PID controller applies this data to calculate a duty cycle that will achieve the desired temperature. As the pellet grill rises toward the programmed temperature, it will continuously take readings and adjust the duty cycle as necessary. Even after the target temperature has been met, these adjustments continue throughout the duration of the cook. The constant monitoring of temperatures and recalculation of the duty cycle enables pellet grills that use PID controllers to hit the target temperature and maintain it for hours.

Induction fans

A significant factor in pellet grill temperature control is the ability to regulate airflow to the fire. The improvement in induction fans has paralleled the advancement in controllers. Early pellet grills had fans that ran continuously once the power was turned on. That meant oxygen was constantly being fed to the fire, making it harder to control temperatures. Eventually, continuous fans were replaced by ones that ran in conjunction with the auger-on cycle. However, that still meant that every time pellets were being fed to the fire, so was oxygen. As a result, some manufacturers have incorporated intermittent fans into pellet grills. These fans work independent of the auger and can turn on and off to feed oxygen to the fire only when necessary.

References

Barbecue
Cooking